Magomedrasul Magomedalievich Khasbulaev (born October 23, 1986) is a Russian mixed martial artist, who at one time fought in the Featherweight division for the Bellator Fighting Championships. Khasbulaev is a Combat Sambo Russia National Champion. He is the former ACA Featherweight Champion.

Mixed martial arts career

Early career
Khasbulaev made his professional debut in April 2009, his coach was his brother, Shamil Zavurov.

Khasbulaev reached tournament final where he lost to Shamil Zavurov via submission (rear-naked choke) in the first round.

Khasbulaev faced Daniel Weichel on March 5, 2011 at M-1 Challenge XXIII: Grishin vs Guram. He lost via submission (triangle choke) in the first round.

Bellator MMA
In July Khasbulaev signed with the Bellator Fighting Championships.

In his North American debut, Khasbulaev faced Nayeb Hezam on October 12, 2012 at Bellator 76. He won the fight via KO in the first round.

Khasbulaev quickly returned to the cage for Bellator as he fought less than a month later at Bellator 79 on November 2, 2012. He defeated Josh Pulsifer by rear-naked choke submission in the first round.

Khasbulaev faced Fabricio Guerreiro in Featherweight Tournament on February 7, 2013 at Bellator 88. He won the fight via submission in the second round.

Khasbulaev faced Marlon Sandro in the Bellator Season Eight Featherweight Tournament on March 7, 2013 at Bellator 92. After two rounds of total domination, he won the fight via TKO in the third round. He will now meet Mike Richman in the finals.

Khasbulaev faced Mike Richman in the finals of the Bellator Season Eight Featherweight Tournament on April 4, 2013 at Bellator 95. He won the fight via unanimous decision and will now have a shot at the Featherweight Champion later in 2014.

After many visa issues, he was released from Bellator.

World Series of Fighting
On 22 April 2015 Khasbulaev signed with the WSOF. Khasbulaev was expected to face former WSOF featherweight champion Rick Glenn on June 5, 2015 at WSOF 21. However, Glenn pulled out of the fight due to an undisclosed injury.

Absolute Championship Berkut
After injury Khasbulaev signed with the ACB.

Khasbulaev was expected to face Brazilian Antonio Magno Pereira on September 12, 2015 at ACB 22: St. Petersburg. He won by submission in the first round.

Khasbulaev is expected to face Eduard Vartanyan on December 19, 2015 at ACB 27: Dushanbe. He lost this fight via unanimous decision.

World Fighting Championship Akhmat
Khasbulaev was expected to face American Kurt Holobaugh on March 16, 2016 at WFCA 16. He won the fight via unanimous decision.

In second fight at the WFCA on May 22, 2016 he beat Khunkar-Pasha Osmaev by unanimous decision.

Khasbulaev faced Salman Zhamaldaev at WCFA 23 Featherweight Grand Prix on October 4, 2016. He lost the fight via unanimous decision.

Khasbulaev faced Fernando Vieira at WCFA 33 on February 4, 2017. He won the fight via technical knockout in the third round.

Khasbulaev faced Genair da Silva at WCFA 38 on May 21, 2017. He won the fight via knockout in the second round.

Absolute Championship Akhmat

Khasbulaev faced  Felipe Froes on March 26, 2021 at ACA 120: Oliveira vs. Bibulatov for the vacant ACA Featherweight Championship. After dominating the bout, he finally submitted Froes via rear-naked choke in the fourth round, winning the title in the process. 

Khasbulaev's first defense of the ACA Featherweight title was scheduled against Ramazan Kishev on August 28, 2021 at ACA 127: Khasbulaev vs. Kishev. However, on August 4, Khasbulaev was removed from the card because of an injury, the title bout was moved to ACA 131: Abdulvakhabov vs. Dias. He won the bout via ground and pound at the end of the third round.

After Khasbulaev pulled out due to injury three times in 2022 in bouts against Alikhan Suleymanov, Khasbulaev was stripped of his title.

Championships and accomplishments

Mixed martial arts
Absolute Championship Akhmat
ACA Featherweight Championship (One time)
One successful title defence
Bellator MMA
Bellator Season Eight Featherweight Tournament Championship
League S-70
S-70 2012 Russian Welterweight Tournament Winner
M-1 Global
M-1 Selection 2010 Eastern European Welterweight Tournament Runner-Up

Sambo
World Combat Sambo Federation
2010 WCSF World Combat Sambo Championships
Fédération Internationale Amateur de Sambo
2015 European Combat Sambo Championships
Russian Combat Sambo Federation
Russian Combat Sambo National Championships (2009)

Mixed martial arts record

|-
|Win
|align=center|34–8
| Ramazan Kishev
| |TKO (punches)
| ACA 131: Abdulvakhabov vs. Dias 
| 
|align=center|3
|align=center|4:59
| Moscow, Russia
|
|-
|Win
|align=center|33–8
|Felipe Froes
|Submission (rear-naked choke)
|ACA 120: Oliveira vs. Bibulatov
|
|align=center|4
|align=center|1:02
|Saint Petersburg, Russia
|
|-
| Win
| align=center|32–8
| Levan Makashvili
| Decision (unanimous)
| ACA 104: Goncharov vs. Vakhaev
| 
| align=center|3
| align=center|5:00
| Krasnodar, Russia
|
|-
| Win
| align=center|31–8
| Alexandre Bezerra
| TKO (punches)
| ACA 100: Zhamaldaev vs. Froes 2
| 
| align=center|3
| align=center|1:27
| Grozny, Russia
|
|-
| Win
| align=center| 30–8
| Mukhamed Kokov
| Decision (unanimous)
| ACA 94: Bagov vs. Khaliev
| 
| align=center| 3
| align=center| 5:00
| Krasnodar, Russia
| 
|-
| Win
| align=center| 29–8
| Rob Emerson
| Submission (rear-naked choke)
| WCFA 54
| 
| align=center| 2
| align=center| 1:57
| Bahrain
| 
|-
| Loss
| align=center| 28–8
| Salman Zhamaldaev
| Decision (unanimous)
| WCFA 48
| 
| align=center| 5
| align=center| 5:00
| Baku, Azerbaijan
| 
|-
| Win
| align=center| 28–7
| Fernando Duarte
| Submission (rear-naked choke)
| WCFA 44
| 
| align=center| 3
| align=center| 2:55
| Grozny, Chechnya, Russia
| 
|-
| Win
| align=center| 27–7
| Dzihihad Yunusov
| Decision (unanimous)
| WCFA 41
| 
| align=center| 3
| align=center| 5:00
| Grozny, Chechnya, Russia
| 
|-
|Win
| align=center| 26–7
| Genair da Silva
| KO  (punch)
| WFCA 38
| 
| align=center| 2
| align=center| 4:00
| Grozny, Chechnya, Russia
|
|-
|Win
| align=center| 25–7
| Fernando Vieira
| TKO  (retirement)
| WFCA 33
| 
| align=center| 3
| align=center| 1:57
| Grozny, Chechnya, Russia
|
|-
| Loss
| align=center| 24–7
| Salman Zhamaldaev
| Decision (unanimous)
| WFCA 23: Grand Prix Akhmat 2016
| 
| align=center| 5
| align=center| 5:00
| Grozny, Chechnya, Russia
|  Akhmat Featherweight GP Final.
|-
| Win
| align=center| 24–6
| Khunkar Osmaev
| Decision (unanimous)
| WFCA 22: Grand Prix Akhmat 2016
| 
| align=center| 3
| align=center| 5:00
| Grozny, Chechnya, Russia
|  Akhmat GP Semifinals.
|-
| Win
| align=center| 23–6
| Kurt Holobaugh
| Decision (unanimous)
| WFCA 16: Grand Prix Akhmat 2016
| 
| align=center| 3
| align=center| 5:00
| Grozny, Chechnya, Russia
| Return to Featherweight. Akhmat GP Quarterfinals.
|-
|-
| Loss
| align=center| 22–6
| Eduard Vartanyan
| Decision (unanimous)
| ACB 27: Tajikistan
| 
| align=center| 3
| align=center| 5:00
| Dushanbe, Tajikistan
| Lightweight bout.
|-
| Win
| align=center| 22–5
| Antonio Magno Pereira
| Submission (rear-naked choke)
| ACB 22: Grand Prix 2015 Finals Stage 1
| 
| align=center| 1
| align=center| 1:40
| St. Petersburg, Leningrad, Russia
| 
|-
| Win
| align=center| 21–5
| Mike Richman
| Decision (unanimous)
| Bellator 95
| 
| align=center| 3
| align=center| 5:00
| Atlantic City, New Jersey, United States
| 
|-
| Win
| align=center| 20–5
| Marlon Sandro
| TKO (punches)
| Bellator 92
| 
| align=center| 3
| align=center| 2:38
| Temecula, California, United States
| 
|-
| Win
| align=center| 19–5
| Fabricio Guerreiro
| Submission (arm triangle choke)
| Bellator 88
| 
| align=center| 2
| align=center| 1:15
| Duluth, Georgia, United States
| Bellator Season Eight Featherweight Tournament Quarterfinal
|-
| Win
| align=center| 18–5
| Josh Pulsifer
| Submission (rear-naked choke)
| Bellator 79
| 
| align=center| 1
| align=center| 3:30
| Rama, Ontario, Canada
| Bellator Season Seven Featherweight Tournament Reserve Bout
|-
| Win
| align=center| 17–5
| Nayeb Hezam
| KO (punches)
| Bellator 76
| 
| align=center| 1
| align=center| 0:24
| Windsor, Ontario, Canada
| Bellator Season Seven Featherweight Tournament Reserve Bout
|-
| Win
| align=center| 16–5
| Alexei Nazarov
| Decision (unanimous)
| League S-70: Russian Championship Finals
| 
| align=center| 3
| align=center| 5:00
| Sochi, Krasnodar Krai, Russia
| S-70 2012 Russian Welterweight Tournament Final
|-
| Win
| align=center| 15–5
|Ali Bagov
| KO (punch)
| League S-70: Russian Championship Semifinals
| 
| align=center| 2
| align=center| 1:57
| Moscow, Moscow Oblast, Russia
| S-70 2012 Russian Welterweight Tournament Semifinal
|-
| Win
| align=center| 14–5
| Sergei Andreev
| TKO (Punches)
| League S-70: Russian Championship First Round
| 
| align=center| 1
| align=center| 2:20
| Volgograd, Volgograd Oblast, Russia
| S-70 2012 Russian Welterweight Tournament Opening Round
|-
| Win
| align=center| 13–5
| Magomed Dzhavadkhanov
| Submission (heel hook)
| ProFC: Battle in the Caucasus
| 
| align=center| 1
| align=center| 1:14
| Khasavyurt, Republic of Dagestan, Russia
| 
|-
| Loss
| align=center| 12–5
| Daniel Weichel
| Technical Submission (triangle choke)
| M-1 Challenge 23: Guram vs. Grishin
| 
| align=center| 1
| align=center| 3:26
| Moscow, Moscow Oblast, Russia
| 
|-
| Win
| align=center| 12–4
| Krzysztof Wolski
| Submission (heel hook)
| Fight on the East: Poland vs. Ukraine
| 
| align=center| 1
| align=center| 2:02
| Rzeszów, Sandomierz Basin, Poland
| 
|-
| Win
| align=center| 11–4
| Jakub Tangiev
| TKO (punches)
| ProFC: Union Nation Cup 10
| 
| align=center| 1
| align=center| 4:20
| Yerevan, Armenia
| 
|-
| Win
| align=center| 10–4
| Jaroslav Franchuk
| TKO (punches)
| M-1 Selection Ukraine 2010: Round 6
| 
| align=center| 1
| align=center| 4:47
| Kyiv, Ukraine
| 
|-
| Loss
| align=center| 9–4
| Ivan Buchinger
| Submission (rear-naked choke)
| Heroes Gate 2
| 
| align=center| 2
| align=center| 4:09
| Prague, Vltava, Czech Republic
| 
|-
| Win
| align=center| 9–3
| Sergey Grechka
| Submission (rear-naked choke)
| M-1 Global: M-1 Ukraine Battle of Lions
| 
| align=center| 1
| align=center| 3:30
| Lviv, Lviv Oblast, Ukraine
| 
|-
| Win
| align=center| 8–3
| Kirill Krikunov
| Submission (armbar)
| M-1 Selection Ukraine 2010: Clash of the Titans
| 
| align=center| 1
| align=center| 4:59
| Kyiv,  Ukraine
| 
|-
| Win
| align=center| 7–3
| Kirill Krikunov
| Submission (triangle choke)
| M-1 Global: Battle on the Neva 4
| 
| align=center| 1
| align=center| 2:13
| Saint Petersburg, Leningrad Oblast, Russia
| 
|-
| Loss
| align=center| 6–3
| Shamil Zavurov
| Submission (rear-naked choke)
| M-1 Selection 2010: Eastern Europe Finals
| 
| align=center| 1
| align=center| 3:16
| Moscow, Moscow Oblast, Russia
| M-1 Selection 2010 Eastern European Welterweight Tournament Final
|-
| Win
| align=center| 6–2
| Radik Iboyan
| Submission (armbar)
| M-1 Selection 2010: Eastern Europe Round 3
| 
| align=center| 1
| align=center| 1:50
| Kyiv, Ukraine
| M-1 Selection 2010 Eastern European Welterweight Tournament Semifinal
|-
| Win
| align=center| 5–2
| Rashid Magomedov
| Decision (split)
| M-1 Selection 2010: Eastern Europe Round 2
| 
| align=center| 3
| align=center| 5:00
| Kyiv,  Ukraine
| M-1 Selection 2010 Eastern European Welterweight Tournament Quarterfinal
|-
| Win
| align=center| 4–2
| Vladimir Papusha
| Submission (heel hook)
| ProFC: Union Nation Cup 5
| 
| align=center| 2
| align=center| 2:03
| Nalchik, Kabardino-Balkar Republic, Russia
| 
|-
| Loss
| align=center| 3–2
| David Khachatryan
| Submission (rear-naked choke)
| ProFC: Union Nation Cup 3
| 
| align=center| 2
| align=center| 2:30
| Rostov-on-Don, Rostov Oblast, Russia
| 
|-
| Win
| align=center| 3–1
| Gadzhi Dzhangishiev
| Submission
| M-1 Challenge: 2009 Selections 7
| 
| align=center| 1
| align=center| N/A
| Moscow, Moscow Oblast, Russia
| 
|-
| Loss
| align=center| 2–1
| Rashid Magomedov
| Decision (unanimous)
| M-1 Challenge: 2009 Selections 5
| 
| align=center| 3
| align=center| 5:00
| Saint Petersburg, Leningrad Oblast, Russia
| 
|-
| Win
| align=center| 2–0
| Ramzan Algeriev
| Submission (toe hold)
| Pancration SFD Championship 2
| 
| align=center| 1
| align=center| 3:15
| Cherkessk, Karachay-Cherkess Republic, Russia
| 
|-
| Win
| align=center| 1–0
| Yusup Magomedov
| Submission (armbar)
| Pancration SFD Championship 1
| 
| align=center| 1
| align=center| 3:15
| Cherkessk, Karachay-Cherkess Republic, Russia
|

References

External links

1987 births
Living people
Russian Muslims
Dagestani mixed martial artists
Russian sambo practitioners
Sportspeople from Makhachkala
Russian expatriates in the United States
Russian male mixed martial artists
Mixed martial artists utilizing sambo
Avar people